Davoud is a given name. Notable people with the name include:
Davoud A., scientist and CEO
Davoud Abedinzadeh (born 1986), Iranian wrestler
Davoud Daneshdoost (born 1985), Iranian footballer
Davoud Danesh-Jafari, Minister of Economy and Finance Affairs of Iran
Davoud Fanaei (born 1976), Iranian football goalkeeper
Davoud Haghi (born 1981), Iranian football player
Davoud Hermidas-Bavand (born 1934), Iranian political scientist
Davoud Mahabadi (born 1973), Iranian football manager and former player
Davoud Noshi Sofiani (born 1990), Iranian football goalkeeper
Davoud Rashidi (born 1933), Iranian actor
Davoud Seyed Abbasi (born 1977), Iranian football player who plays in the midfield position
Davoud Soleymani, Iranian politician
Davoud Yaqoubi, Afghan footballer

de:Davoud